Estrela Vermelha Beira, or simply Estrela Vermelha, is a Mozambique multi sports club from Beira, Mozambique especially known for its football.

Estrela Vermelha was relegated from the Moçambola (the top division of Mozambique football) following the 2016 season.

Stadium
Currently the team plays at the 7000 capacity  Estádio do Ferroviário.

References

External links

Football clubs in Mozambique